Tunggare (also called Tarunggare, Tarunggareh, Turunggare) is a language spoken in Papua, Indonesia.

References

Languages of western New Guinea
East Geelvink Bay languages
Endangered languages